Public transport in Athens comprises a bus network, various rail systems, funiculars, and maritime services to serve the more than 4 million inhabitants of the city spread over an area of 2928 km2.

Rail transport

Metro 

The Athens Metro is operated by Stasy S.A (Statheres Sygkoinonies S.A) which is a subsidiary company of OASA (Athens urban transport organisation) and provides public transport throughout the Athens Urban Area. While its main purpose is transport, it also houses Greek artifacts found during construction of the system. The Athens Metro has an operating staff of 387 and runs three metro lines; namely the Line 1 (Green), Line 2 (Red) and line 3 (Blue) lines, of which the first was constructed in 1869, and the other two largely during the 1990s, with the initial sections opened in January 2000. The line 1 for the most part runs at ground level and the other two (lines 2,3) routes run entirely underground (except the Doukisis Plakentias-Airport section) and a fleet of 42 trains consisting of 252 cars operate within the network, with a daily occupancy of 1,353,000 passengers.

Line 1  
Line 1 (the Green Line) serves 24 stations, and forms the oldest line of the Athens metro network. Runs from Piraeus station to Kifissia station and covers a distance of 25.6-kilometre (15.9 mi). There are also transfer connections with the Blue (line 3) at Monastiraki station and with Red (line 2) at Omonia and Attiki stations.

Line 2 
Line 2 (the Red Line) runs from Anthoupoli station to Elliniko station and covers a distance of 17.5 km (10.9 mi).[116] The line connects the western suburbs of Athens with the southeast suburbs, passing through the center of Athens. The Red line has transfer connections with the Green (line 1) at Attiki and Omonia Square stations. There are also transfer connections with the Blue (line 3) at the Syntagma Square station and with the Tram at Syntagma Square, Sygrou-Fix and Agios Ioannis stations.

Line 3 
The spring 2007 extension from Monastiraki westwards, to Egaleo, connected some of the main night life hubs of the city, namely the ones of Gazi (Kerameikos station) with Psirri (Monastiraki station) and the city centre (Syntagma station). Extensions are under construction westwards to Piraeus.

Suburban Railway (Proastiakos) 

The Suburban Railway will be extended to Patras.

Tram 

Stasy operates a fleet of 60 vehicles, 35 'Ansaldobreda Sirio' and 25 'Alstom Citadis 305', which serve 60 stations, employ 345 people with an average daily occupancy of 65,000 passengers. The network runs from Syntagma Square to the southwestern suburb of Palaio Faliro, where the line splits in two branches; the first runs along the coastline toward the southern suburb of Voula, while the other heads towards the port of Piraeus. The network covers the majority of the Athens coastline.

Railways and ferry connections 

Athens is the hub of the country's national railway system (OSE), connecting the capital with major cities across Greece and abroad (Istanbul, Sofia and Bucharest). Due to low demand and financial difficulties, all international rail services were suspended indefinitely in 2011. The Port of Piraeus connects Athens to the numerous Greek islands of the Aegean Sea, with ferries departing, while also serving the cruise ships that arrive.

Road transport

Bus transport

OSY (Odikes SYgkinonies), or Road Transport, is the main operator of the bus network in Athens. It was created in 2011 after the merger of ETHEL and ILPAP, the two previous bus operators in Athens. As of 2017, its network consists of about 322 bus lines which span the Athens Metropolitan Area. As of 2020 has an operating staff of 4,669, and a fleet of 1,897 buses. Of those 1,897 buses, 301 run on compressed natural gas and 286 are electric buses (trolleybuses). All of the 286 trolleybuses are equipped to enable them to run on diesel in case of power failure.
Intercity and regional bus links are provided by KTEL from two InterCity Bus Terminals, Kifissos Bus Terminal A and Liosion Bus Terminal B, both located in the center-western part of the city. International bus links are provided by various private transport companies..

The daytime bus network in the city run between the hours of 05:00 – 00:00 generally. OSY has two bus routes which operate on a 24-hour basis; the 11 and 040. Most routes depart on a 30-60 minute frequency Mon-Sun. It also runs three intermunicipal night lines (which operate after midnight); X14, 500 and 790. The Athens Transport Authority also operates four 24-hour express bus-lines from Athens International Airport to different parts of the city. The X95 links to the city centre, the X93 links to Kifissos and Liosion bus stations, the X96 links to the Port of Piraeus and the X97 links to Elliniko metro station. As of 2021 the fare on these services was 5.50 euro per person.

Bus depots in Athens
There are 8 bus depots in the Athens greater area.

Athens bus rolling stock

Leased (2021- )

Owned by OSY and its predecessors

Athens public transportation statistics 
The average amount of time people spend commuting with public transit in Athens, for example to and from work, on a weekday is 71 min. 16% of public transit riders, ride for more than 2 hours every day. The average amount of time people wait at a stop or station for public transit is 18 min, while 34% of riders wait for over 20 minutes on average every day. The average distance people usually ride in a single trip with public transit is 6.8 km, while 13% travel for over 12 km in a single direction.

Notes

References 

Athens
Athens